Mount Assiniboine, also known as Assiniboine Mountain, is a pyramidal peak mountain located on the Great Divide, on the British Columbia/Alberta border in Canada.

At , it is the highest peak in the Southern Continental Ranges of the Canadian Rockies. Because of its resemblance to the Matterhorn in the Alps, it is nicknamed the "Matterhorn of the Rockies".

Mount Assiniboine was named by George M. Dawson in 1885. When Dawson saw Mount Assiniboine from Copper Mountain, he saw a plume of clouds trailing away from the top. This reminded him of the plumes of smoke emanating from the teepees of the Assiniboine people.

Mount Assiniboine lies on the border between Mount Assiniboine Provincial Park, in British Columbia, and Banff National Park, in Alberta. The mountain can be reached only by a six-hour hike or horse-pack , three-hour bike ride (now disallowed to reduce human / grizzly encounters) or helicopter.

Climbing 
Mt. Assiniboine was first climbed in the summer of 1901 by James Outram, Christian Bohren and Christian Hasler. In 1925, Lawrence Grassi became the first person to make a solo ascent. On August 27, 2001, Bohren's granddaughter Lonnie along with three others made a successful ascent, celebrating the 100th anniversary of the first ascent.

There are no scrambling routes up Mt. Assiniboine. The easiest mountaineering routes are the North Ridge and North Face at YDS 5.5 which are reached from the Hind Hut.

See also
List of mountains of British Columbia
Mountain peaks of Canada
List of mountain peaks of North America
List of mountain peaks of the Rocky Mountains

References

External links
 
 Biv Home Mount Assiniboine in Canadian Mountain Encyclopedia (Bivouac.com)
 SummitPost - Mt. Assiniboine
 
 
 ACC - Accident history

Mountains of Banff National Park
Three-thousanders of British Columbia
Three-thousanders of Alberta
Regional District of East Kootenay
Borders of Alberta
Borders of British Columbia
Mount Assiniboine Provincial Park